Bruce Robert Akers (born 28 February 1953) is an Australian former wrestler who competed in the 1972 Summer Olympics and in the 1976 Summer Olympics as well as the 1974 British Commonwealth Games.

Akers later ran horses in picnic meets, but in 2016 was charged after 22 horses were found dead from starvation on his property. He admitted 23 charges of animal neglect and was initially sentenced to 18 months in jail, but on appeal this sentence was reduced to 6 months plus a 12-month community corrections order.

References

External links
 
 

1953 births
Living people
Olympic wrestlers of Australia
Wrestlers at the 1972 Summer Olympics
Wrestlers at the 1976 Summer Olympics
Australian male sport wrestlers
Commonwealth Games competitors for Australia
Wrestlers at the 1974 British Commonwealth Games